Tanheli is an archaeological site in Ningxiang, Hunan, one of major national historical and cultural sites in Hunan.

Situated in the upper reaches of the Wei River in Tanheli village, Huangcai town, Ningxiang, it is renowned as a Bronze Age cultural center in South China. Tanheli is famous as the location where the Four-goat Square Zun and the Da He ding were excavated along with 300 other bronze relics. It was identified as a site of the Western Zhou dynasty (ca. 11th century–771 BC).

References

Bibliography
 

Bronze Age in China
Archaeological sites in China
Ancient Chinese cities
Major National Historical and Cultural Sites in Hunan
History of Changsha
Tourist attractions in Changsha
Buildings and structures in Ningxiang